High Definition is an album by American jazz musician Joe Morris which was recorded in 2007 and released on the Swiss hatOLOGY label. Morris plays double bass instead of guitar. It was the debut recording by his Bass Quartet featuring trumpeter Taylor Ho Bynum, saxophonist Allan Chase and drummer Luther Gray. Chase played previously with the rhythm section composed of Morris and Gray on pianist Steve Lantner's quartet.

Reception

The All About Jazz review by Glenn Astarita states "With the undeniably synergistic interplay of the ensemble, Morris pursues a striking balance between ultra-modern mainstream, and avant-garde tinged progressive jazz."

In his review for The New York Times, Ben Ratliff notes that "High Definition is more traditional than most of Mr. Morris's albums, and not only because it recalls 50-year-old sources. It's also because Mr. Morris is more conventional as a bass player than he is as a guitarist."

The Down Beat review by Peter Margasak says that "the real accomplishment on High Definition is how Morris fits invisibly in the group flow, particularly with drummer Luther Gray. Together, they mete out an imperturbable pulse."

Track listing
All compositions by Joe Morris
 "Skeleton" – 8:21
 "Morning Group" – 8:22
 "Land Mass" – 7:50 
 "Topics" – 6:53
 "Bearing" – 4:31 
 "All-In_One" – 8:13
 "Super Spot" – 3:51 
 "The Air Has Color" – 5:18

Personnel
Taylor Ho Bynum – cornet, trumpet, flugelhorn 
Allan Chase – alto sax, baritone sax, soprano sax
Joe Morris - double bass
Luther Gray – drums

References

2008 albums
Joe Morris (guitarist) albums
Hathut Records albums